is an asteroid, classified as near-Earth object of the Apollo group that is also a Mercury-crosser, Venus-crosser, and Mars-crosser. It was discovered by the LINEAR program on 14 June 2002.

See also
 List of Mercury-crossing minor planets
 List of Venus-crossing minor planets
 Apollo asteroids
 List of Mars-crossing minor planets

References

External links 
 
 
 

089958
089958
089958
089958
089958
20020614